Andrew Stewart Moscrip (March 17, 1915 – January 18, 1978) was a former Republican member of the Pennsylvania House of Representatives.

References

Republican Party members of the Pennsylvania House of Representatives
1978 deaths
1915 births
20th-century American politicians